Tissue-resident memory T cells or TRM cells represent a subset of a long-lived memory T cells that occupies epithelial and mucosal tissues (skin, mucosa, lung, brain, pancreas, gastrointestinal tract) without recirculating. TRM cells are transcriptionally, phenotypically and functionally distinct from central memory (TCM) and effector memory (TEM) T cells which recirculate between blood, the T cell zones of secondary lymphoid organ, lymph and nonlymphoid tissues. Moreover, TRM cells themself represent a diverse populations because of the specializations for the resident tissues. The main role of TRM cells is to provide superior protection against infection in extralymphoid tissues.

Phenotype 
The main cell surface markers that has been associated with TRM are CD69 and CD103. CD69 suppress response to the S1P chemoattractant from blood and lymph and prevents TRM cells exit from peripheral tissue. Therefore, CD69 has a key role in distinguishing T cells in tissues from those in circulation. However, expression levels can differ between T cells in different TRM cell subsets what support phenotypic heterogeneity of TRM cells. CD103 is expressed by most CD8+ TRM cells and rarely by CD4+ TRM cells. Another marker that can be used to  separate  two TRM cell subsets  with distinct functions is CD49a. CD8+ CD49a+ TRM cells produce perforin and IFN-gamma, which is a key cytokine in clearing virus infections. CD8+ CD49a- TRM cells produce IL-17. TRM cells have tissue residency-promoting transcriptional signature, features specific to individual tissues and features necessary for long-term survival in these tissues.
 Skin TRM: TRM cells in the skin express cutaneous lymphocyte antigen (CLA) and CCR8 which are skin homing antigens. They have also higher expression of markers CD103 and CD69, integrins, cytokine/growth factor receptors and signaling molecules CD49a, CD122 and PD-1. On the other hand, they have downregulated chemokine receptors CCR7 and S1P1 which are important for recirculation. Skin TRM cells can survive in the skin for years depending upon IL-15 and fatty acid metabolism. IL-15 and TCF-ß are required for differentiation of TRM cells in the skin in mouse models.
 Lung TRM: Lung TRM cells play important role in protection against respiratory infections. CD4+ follicular helper TRM cells promotes protection against virus infection by inducing B cells and CD8+ T cells. CD8+ TRM cells produce IFNɤ which is their way of destroying the virus. TRM cells can also recruit neutrophils in case of bacterial infection. However, pathologic inflammation caused by lung TRM cells can lead to development of asthma or fibrosis. Human lung TRM CD4+ CD103+ cells express higher levels of CD103, CTLA4, KLRC1 and ICOS. CTLA4 is an inhibitor protein which role may lie in limitation of excessive effector and cytolytic activity which could lead to immune pathologies. On the other hand, they have lower expression of S1P receptor S1PR1, homing receptor to lymph node CD62L, activation marker KLRG1, KLF2 and CCR7 than TEM in the blood. 
 Other TRM: The majority of TRM express CD69 and CD103 markers. However, TRM without CD103 expression can be found in intestines, secondary lymphoid organs and liver. Moreover, TRM without both markers, CD69 and CD103, were found in substancial proportion in pancreas, salivary glands and female reproductive tract of mice.

Development 
TRM cells develop from circulating effector memory T cell precursors in response to antigen. The main role in formation of TRM cells has CD103 and expression of this integrin is dependent on the cytokine TGF-β. CD8+ effector T cells that lack TGF-β fail to upregulate CD103, and subsequently do not differentiate into TRM cells. The important role in development of TRM cells have various cytokines that support TRM cell formation and survival. For example, homeostatic cytokine IL-15, pro-inflammatory cytokines such as IL-12 and IL-18, and barrier cytokines such as IL-33. Also, generation of CD103+ TRM cells requires low expression of Eomes and T-bet transcription factors.

Shortly after antigen-specific response in the non-lymphoid tissue, infected tissue is occupied by CD8+ effector-stage T cells (TEFF). These cells present early in the tissue have higher expression of some genes typical for TRM and at the peak of the T cell response, local T cell population expresses more than 90% of the TRM gene signature. This shows that differentiation process of TRM cells starts early during immune response.

Function 
TRM cells reside in many tissues that create barriers against outside environment and thus provide defense against repeatedly incoming pathogens. In the skin, lung, brain, and vagina TRM cells are required to provide immediate rapid control of re-infection. CD4+ TRM cells provide better protection against repeated infection with influenza in comparison with circulating memory CD4+ T cells. Moreover, CD8+ TRM cells also play role in the protection against malignancies. TRM cells express granzyme B which helps limit the spread of pathogens at the site of infection. Also, phenotypic and functional diversity is not only in TRM from different tissues, but it could be found in various TRM subsets within the same tissue. For example, CD49a distinguishes CD8+ TRM subsets with different functions. TRM cells positive for this marker produce perforin and IFNɤ. On the other side, TRM without CD49a expression produce IL-17. IFNɤ production depends on the localization of TRM in the tissue niche. CD8+ TRM in mouse airways produce significant IFNɤ in comparison to parenchymal CD8+ TRM cells. After reactivation, TRM cells undergo rapid proliferation in situ. Increase in TRM numbers after repeated exposure to antigens is not derived just from existing TRM, but circulating T cells contribute to the generation and higher numbers of TRM, too. Also, not every TRM express CD69 and CD103 what support phenotypic heterogeneity of TRM cells. TRM cells are able to activate innate and adaptive leukocytes to protect the host. Cooperation of TRM cells with other memory T cell populations provide tissue surveillance and clearance of the infections.

Potential of CD8+ TRM cells in cancer immunotherapy 
Cytotoxic CD8+ T lymphocytes are able to recognize malignant cells. Production of neoantigens by tumour cells can lead to peptides which are presented to CD8+ T cells bound to MHC I. After antigen recognition, CD8+ T cells destroy tumor cells using IFN-ɤ, TNF-α, granzyme B and perforin. However, malignant cells can avoid this elimination by various mechanisms such as the loss of MHC I molecule, induction of anti-inflammatory tumor micro-environment, inhibition of T cell function, upregulation of ligands whose interactions with CD8+ T cell receptors results in their suppression etc. Immune checkpoint therapy and tumor-infiltrating lymphocytes (TIL) therapy are cancer immunotherapy strategies whose principle lies in suppression of tumor cell inhibitory pathways or in introduction of expanded CD8+ T cells. Whereas large fraction of TILs are TRM cells, they are candidates for solid cancer immunotherapy.

TRM cells infiltrated in tumors have protective role and are associated with good clinical results in various cancer types, but not in pancreatic cancer. They have decreased expression of IFN-ɤ, TNF-α and IL-2 in comparison with circulating T cells in melanoma patients what suggest different mechanism for tumor growth control. Upregulation of granzyme A and granzyme B was found in TRM cells in lung carcinoma patients. However, in TRM cells are also upregulated immune checkpoint receptors. This suggests, that most of the tumor TRM show an exhausted phenotype which may be saved by immune checkpoint inhibitor therapies. Nonidentical tumors may contain different TRM populations.

Role in disease pathogenesis 
Autoreactive TRM cells and reduced ratio or activity of regulatory T cells (Tregs) which protects body from autoimmunity by securing self-tolerance may induce autoimmune diseases sucha as vitiligo, cutaneous lupus erythematosus, psoriasis, alopecia areata, cicatricial alopecia,multiple sclerosis, lupus nephritis, rheumatoid arthritis and autoimmune hepatitis.

Vitiligo
Vitiligo is an autoimmune skin disease with white spots phenotype. CD8+ T lymphocytes destroy melanocytes in some parts of the skin what manifest like white spots on the skin. Multiple genes as well as environment play role in developing vitiligo and migration of CD8+ T cells correlates with the state of disease. 80% of autoreactive CD8+ T cells which are specific towards melanocyte self-antigens express CD69 or CD69 and CD103 TRM markers. There is also higher number of CD49a+ CD8+ CD103+ T cells with cytotoxic potential in epiderma and derma of the vitiligo patients in comparison with healthy skin. Treatment of vitiligo lies in inhibition of JAK/STAT signaling pathway using JAK inhibitors. TRM cells have reduced IFNɤ production and white spots on skin disappear. However, the treatment can not be stopped, because white spots will appear again.

Cutaneous Lupus Erythematosus (CLE)
CLE is another autoimmune skin disease with several subtypes. Common feature is interface dermatitis or inflammation at the dermal-epidermal junction. Again, contribution of genetic and environment factors lead to the development of CLE. It is not really clear what is the specificity of the T cell causing CLE in the skin, but some studies showed T cells reactive to nucleosomes/histones. Except aberrant T cell signaling which conduces to the pathogenesis of CLE, increased presence of TRM was also found in the skin of CLE patients refractory to antimalarials. Treatment lies in JAK/STAT inhibitors, but can not be stopped, because skin lessions will appear again.

References 

T cells